Giy or GIY may refer to:

 GIY Ireland (Grow It Yourself Ireland), an Ireland-based global movement known as GIY
 Yoy people or Giy, an ethnic group in Southeast Asia
 Probiz Guinee (ICAO Airline code: GIY) 
 Giyani Airport (IATA airports code), South Africa; See List of airports by IATA code: G
 Giyug language (ISO 639:g language code: Giy)

See also
 GIY-YIG, a structural family of Homing endonuclease
 Guy (disambiguation)
 Gay (disambiguation)
 Goy (disambiguation)